Ashley Fernandes (born 14 July 1987 in Goa) is an Indian footballer who plays as a midfielder for Churchill Brothers S.C. in the I-League.

Career

Churchill Brothers
Fernandes made his debut for Churchill Brothers S.C. on 10 December 2012 during an I-League match against Pailan Arrows at the Salt Lake Stadium in Kolkata, West Bengal in which he came on as an injury time substitute for Lenny Rodrigues; Churchill Brothers won the match 0–3.

Career statistics

Club
Statistics accurate as of 12 May 2013

References

External links
 

1987 births
Living people
Footballers from Goa
Churchill Brothers FC Goa players
Indian footballers
Association football midfielders